'Tirlok Nath Chaturvedi’ (12 January 1928-5 January 2020), was a member of the 1950 batch of the Indian Administrative Service (IAS). He held several important positions in the Government of Rajasthan and the Government of India including Collector of Ajmer, Chief Commissioner, Chandigarh, Chief Secretary, Delhi Administration, Joint Director and Director, LBSNAA, Mussoorie, Director, Indian Institute of Public Administration. He was Secretary, Ministry of Education and Culture and served as Home Secretary, Government of India. He was the 9th Governor of Karnataka and served from 2002 to 2007.

After retirement from the IAS, Chaturvedi held the office of Comptroller and Auditor General of India from 1984 to 1989. He was awarded the Padma Vibhushan in 1991. He became Governor of Karnataka on 21 August 2002. He was also the Governor of Kerala from 25 February 2004, following the death of Sikander Bakht, until June 2004, when he was replaced by a newly appointed governor. Chaturvedi gained wide recognition for his role as Karnataka Governor.
He was succeeded as governor by Rameshwar Thakur on 21 August 2007.

He was a prospective contender for the post of President of India in 2017.

On 5 January 2020, Chaturvedi died at Kailash Hospital in Noida at age 91.

References

External links

|-

|-

1929 births
2020 deaths
Governors of Karnataka
Governors of Kerala
Indian Administrative Service officers
Recipients of the Padma Vibhushan in civil service
People from Kannauj district
Comptrollers in India
Administrators of Chandigarh
Bharatiya Janata Party politicians from Uttar Pradesh
Rajya Sabha members from Uttar Pradesh
Rajya Sabha members from the Bharatiya Janata Party